Awaran  is an administrative subdivision, (tehsil) of Awaran District in the Balochistan province of Pakistan. It is administratively subdivided into 3 Union Councils.

References 

Awaran District
Tehsils of Balochistan, Pakistan